NCAA Football 11 is a college football video game created by EA Sports and developed by EA Tiburon. It is the successor to NCAA Football 10 in the NCAA Football series. It was released on July 13, 2010 for the PlayStation 2 (PS2), PlayStation 3, Xbox 360. A handheld version was released for iOS on June 24, 2010. It is the last version of NCAA Football to be made for the PS2.

New features
On February 26, 2010, the first features for the game were announced.
 Dynasty Wire, a web based story generator created for Online Dynasty play.
 New momentum based locomotion engine, creating more realistic movements.
 Team-specific entrances into the game.
 Real Assignment AI and a new blocking system.
 Helmet numbers for teams such as Alabama.
 On-field referees.
 Pro-Tak gang tackling.
 Auto-saves.
 Formation substitutions.
 Improved equipment such as helmets, towels, hand warmers, sleeves, and knee braces.
 Dynamic conference logos (for Team Builder play and Custom Conferences).
 Auto loading rosters.
 Single bowl season (for Online Dynasty play).
 New team mascots.
 Improved lighting.
 ESPN style presentation and commentary featuring Brad Nessler, Kirk Herbstreit, and Erin Andrews. Lee Corso will no longer provide commentary for the game.
 Improved recruiting system (for Dynasty Mode play).

Demo
A demo was released on June 14, 2010 at the Xbox Live Marketplace (Xbox 360) and PlayStation Store (PlayStation 3). It included four different matchups to play with as well as alternate uniforms for use in the full game. These matchups are the "Red River Rivalry" with Oklahoma and Texas in the Cotton Bowl and the "Sunshine Showdown" with Florida at Florida State, along with Miami at Ohio State and Missouri at Clemson.

Cover
On April 8, 2010, former Florida Gators Quarterback Tim Tebow was announced as the cover athlete for all four game platforms. The return to a single cover athlete breaks the trend that was seen in the previous two installments of the series where a different cover athlete was chosen for each platform.

Marketing
In July 2010, Time Warner announced that it would offer a copy of NCAA Football 11 and a copy of The Greatest College Bowl Game Moments DVD free with a paid subscription to Sports Illustrated.

See also
 Madden NFL 11

References

IOS games
PlayStation 3 games
PlayStation 2 games
Xbox 360 games
Cancelled PlayStation Portable games
College football video games
High school American football video games
Video games developed in Canada
Video games scored by Colin O'Malley
Electronic Arts games
EA Sports games
2010 video games
North America-exclusive video games
Multiplayer and single-player video games
NCAA video games
Video games developed in the United States